Hiroshi Nakamura  (born 22 June 1942) is a Japanese and Canadian judoka, one of only five Canadian judoka to achieve the rank of Kudan (9th dan), and has been deeply involved in the development of Canadian Judo. He has coached the Olympic judo team five times, was inducted into the Judo Canada Hall of Fame in 1998, was made a Member of the Order of Canada in 2013, and was inducted into the Canadian Olympic Committee Hall of Fame in 2019.

Further reading

See also
Judo in Quebec
Judo in Canada
List of Canadian judoka

References

External links
 Hiroshi Nakamura: Canadian Olympic Hall of Fame 2019 (YouTube: Team Canada)

Canadian male judoka
1942 births
Living people